The 1954 Canada Cup took place August 20–22 at the Laval-sur-le-Lac Golf Club in Laval, Quebec, Canada. It was the second Canada Cup event, which became the World Cup in 1967. The tournament was a 72-hole stroke play team event with 25 teams. Each team consisted of two players from a country. The combined score of each team determined the team results.18 holes were played on the first two days with 36 holes played on the final day. The Australian team of Kel Nagle and Peter Thomson won by four strokes over the Argentine team of Antonio Cerdá and Roberto De Vicenzo. Canadian Stan Leonard had the lowest individual score with 275, two strokes ahead of Peter Thomson.

Teams

The Scandinavian team consisted of a Dane, Carl Paulsen, and a Swede, Arne Werkell.

Source

Scores

Source

The leading individual scores were 275 by Stan Leonard and 277 by Peter Thomson.

References

World Cup (men's golf)
Canada Cup
Canada Cup
Canada Cup
Canada Cup